The Men's individual sprint track cycling event at the 2012 Summer Paralympics took place on September 2 at London Velopark. The event was contested by blind and visually impaired cyclists riding with sighted pilots.

Times set in the qualification stage were used to position riders in the knock-out bracket, and subsequently to determine which riders competed for 5th and 6th positions (i.e. those in the original top 6 who did not reach the medal matches).

Qualification

Finals

Quarterfinals
Heat 1

Heat 2

Heat 3

Semifinals
Heat 1

Heat 2

Finals
Gold medal match

Bronze medal match

 5th—6th place classification

References

Men's individual sprint